Gloc-9 has received numerous awards in his career. Most of his awards came from Myx Music Awards, Awit Awards and PMPC Star Awards for Music. Below is a list of all the notable awards he has received:

Awit Awards 

|-
| 2002 || "Isang Araw"|| Best Rap Recording || 
|-
| 2003 || "Pasko Na Naman"|| Best Christmas Song || 
|-
| rowspan="3"| 2008 || rowspan="2"|"Lando" (with Francis Magalona) || Best Rap Recording || 
|-
| Best Performance by a Duet || 
|-
| "Sumayaw Ka" || Best Dance Recording || 
|-
| rowspan=7| 2010 || rowspan=6| "Upuan"|| Best Rap Recording || 
|-
|| Song of the Year || 
|-
|| Best Collaboration Performance || 
|-
|| Best Engineered Recording|| 
|-
|| Best Musical Arrangement || 
|-
|| Texters' Choice for Song of the Year || 
|-
|| "Martilyo" || Best Rock/Alternative Recording || 
|-
| rowspan=5|2012 || rowspan=5| "Walang Natira" (with Sheng Belmonte) || Song of the Year || 
|-
|| Best Rap Recording || 
|-
|| Best Collaboration Performance || 
|-
|| Best Engineered Recording || 
|-
|| Music Video of the Year || 
|-
| rowspan=6| 2013 || rowspan=4| "Sirena" (with Ebe Dancel) || Best Collaboration || 
|-
|| Song of the Year || 
|-
|| Best Rap Recording || 
|-
|| Music Video of the Year || 
|-
|| "Bagsakan" (with Parokya ni Edgar and Frank Magalona) || Best Rap Recording || 
|-
|| MKNM: Mga Kwento Ng Makata || Album of the Year || 
|-
| rowspan=9| 2014 || rowspan=4| "Magda" (with Rico Blanco)|| Best Collaboration || 
|-
|| Song of the Year || 
|-
|| Best Rap Recording || 
|-
|| Music Video of the Year || 
|-
|| Liham at Lihim || Album of the Year || 
|-
|| "Kunwari" (with Kamikazee, Biboy Garcia of Queso and Manuel Legarda of Wolfgang)|| Best Rock/Alternative Recording || 
|-
|| "Ang Parokya" (with Parokya ni Edgar and Frank Magalona) || Best Performance by a Group Recording Artists || 
|-
| rowspan=2| "Papel" (with Joey Ayala and Denise Barbacena) || Best Novelty Recording || 
|-
|| Best World Music Recording || 
|-
| 2015 || "Businessman" (with Vinci Montaner) || Best R&B Recording || 
|-
| 2016 || "Ang Probinsyano" (with Ebe Dancel) || Best Song Written for Movie/TV/Stage Play ||

FAMAS Awards 
{| class="wikitable" rowspan=2 cellpadding="4" style="text-align: center; border:2; background: #f6e39c"
|- style="background:#bebebe;"
!scope="col" style="width:8%;"| Year
!scope="col" style="width:40%;"| Nominee/Work
!scope="col" style="width:50%;"| Award
!scope="col" style="width:8%| Result
!scope="col" style="width:2%;"| Ref.
|-
| 2012 || "Hari ng Tondo" (from Manila Kingpin: The Asiong Salonga Story) (with Denise Barbacena)|| Best Theme Song ||  || 
|-
| rowspan=5|2015 || "Hindi Pa Tapos" (from Bonifacio: Ang Unang Pangulo)||rowspan="2"| Best Original Theme Song ||  || 
|-
|  "Asintado" (from Asintado) ||  ||

Globe Tatt Awards

|-
| 2012 || Himself || Indie Rocker ||

GMMSF Box-Office Entertainment Awards

|-
| 2015 || Himself || Male Recording Artist of the Year ||

Golden Screen Awards

|-
| 2012 || "Hari ng Tondo" (from Manila Kingpin: The Asiong Salonga Story) (with Denise Barbacena)||Best Original Song||

Katha Awards 

|-
| 2002 || "Isang Araw"|| Best Rap Recording || 
|-

Metro Manila Film Festival Awards
{| class="wikitable" rowspan=2 cellpadding="4" style="text-align: center; border:2; background: #f6e39c"
|- style="background:#bebebe;"
!scope="col" style="width:8%;"| Year
!scope="col" style="width:40%;"| Nominee/Work
!scope="col" style="width:50%;"| Award
!scope="col" style="width:8%| Result
!scope="col" style="width:2%;"| Ref.
|-
| 2014 || "Hindi Pa Tapos" (from Bonifacio: Ang Unang Pangulo) (with Denise Barbacena) || Best Original Theme Song ||  ||

MOR Pinoy Music Awards

MTV Pilipinas Awards 

|-
| 2005 || "Sayang"|| Video of the Year || 
|-

MYX Music Awards 

|-
| rowspan=2| 2006 || "Tula"|| Favorite Urban Video|| 
|-
|| "Koro"(with Greyhoundz and Francis M.)|| Favorite Collaboration|| 
|-
| rowspan=4| 2008 || rowspan=2| "Lando" (with Francis M.)|| Favorite Urban Video|| 
|-
|| Favorite Collaboration|| 
|-
|| Himself || Favorite Male Artist|| 
|-
|| Himself || Favorite Myx Live! Performance|| 
|-
| rowspan=6| 2010 || rowspan=2|"Kasalanan" (with 6cyclemind and Wendell Garcia of Pupil)||Favorite Music Video|| 
|-
||Favorite Collaboration|| 
|-
||"Upuan" (with Jeazelle Grutas of Zelle)||Favorite Urban Video||
|-
|| Himself||Favorite Male Artist|| 
|-
|| Himself ||Favorite Myx Live! Performance|| 
|-
||"Balita" (with Gabby Alipe of Urbandub||Favorite Remake||
|-
| rowspan=2| 2011 || "Martilyo" (with Dex of Letter Day Story|| Favorite Collaboration|| 
|-
|| Himself ||Favorite Male Artist||
|-
| rowspan=7| 2012 || rowspan=2|"Walang Natira" (with Sheng Belmonte) || Favorite Song|| 
|-
|| Favorite Collaboration|| 
|-
||"Sari-Saring Kwento" (with Champ Lui Pio and Noel Cabangon)||Favorite Collaboration||
|-
||"One Hit Combo" (with Parokya Ni Edgar)||Favorite Collaboration||
|-
||"Elmer" (with Jaq Dionesio of Kiss Jane and Jomal Linao of Kamikazee)||Favorite Urban Video||
|-
|| Himself || Favorite Artist || 
|-
|| Himself || Favorite Male Artist || 
|-
| rowspan=8| 2013 || rowspan=4|"Sirena" (with Ebe Dancel) || Favorite Song|| 
|-
|| Favorite Music Video|| 
|-
|| Favorite Urban Video|| 
|-
|| Favorite Collaboration|| 
|-
|| Himself || Favorite Artist||  
|-
|| Himself ||Favorite Male Artist||  
|-
|| Himself ||Favorite Myx Live! Performance|| 
|-
|| "Bakit Hindi" (with Billy Crawford)|| Favorite Collaboration || 
|-
| rowspan=7| 2014 || rowspan=4|"Magda" (with Rico Blanco) || Favorite Music Video|| 
|-
|| Favorite Song|| 
|-
|| Favorite Urban Video|| 
|-
|| Favorite Collaboration|| 
|-
|| Himself ||Favorite Male Artist||  
|-
|| Himself || Favorite Artist||  
|-
|| "Ang Parokya" (with Parokya ni Edgar and Frank Magalona) || Favorite Collaboration||  
|-
| rowspan="5"|2015 || rowspan="2"|"Takipsilim" (with Regine Velasquez-Alcasid) || Favorite Music Video || 
|-
|| Favorite Collaboration || 
|-
| rowspan="2"| Himself || Favorite Artist || 
|-
|| Favorite Male Artist || 
|-
|| "Businessman" (with Vinci Montaner) || Favorite Urban Video || 
|-
| 2016 || Tandaan Mo 'To (with Erik Santos) || Favorite Collaboration || 
|-
| rowspan="3"|2017 || Himself || Favorite Male Artist || 
|-
| rowspan="2"|"Hoy!" || Favorite Urban Video || 
|-
|| Best Music Video (Special Award) ||

Philippine Hip-Hop Awards

|-
| 2005 || rowspan="5"|Himself || rowspan="5"|Rap Artist of the Year || 
|-
| 2006 || 
|-
| 2007 || 
|-
| 2008 || 
|-
| 2009 ||

PMPC Star Awards for Music

|-
| rowspan=5| 2011 || rowspan="2"| "Walang Natira" || Song of the Year || 
|-
|| Music Video of the Year || 
|-
| rowspan="2"|Talumpati || Album of the Year || 
|-
|| Rap Album of the Year || 
|-
|| Himself || Rap Artist of the Year || 
|-
| rowspan="5"|2013 || rowspan="2"| MKNM: Mga Kwento Ng Makata || Album of the Year || 
|-
|| Rap Album of the Year || 
|-
|| Himself || Rap Artist of the Year || 
|-
| rowspan="2"|"Sirena" || Song of the Year || 
|-
|| Music Video of the Year || 
|-
| rowspan="6"|2014 || "Magda" || Song of the Year || 
|-
| rowspan="3"|Liham at Lihim || Male Recording Artist of the Year || 
|-
|| Album of the Year || 
|-
|| Rap Album of the Year || 
|-
|| "Magda" || Music Video of the Year || 
|-
|| Himself || Rap Artist of the Year || 
|-
| 2015 || Biyahe ng Pangarap || Male Rocording Artist of the Year || 
|-
| 2019 || "Lagi" || Rap Artist of the Year ||

Tambayan 101.9 OPM Awards

|-
| rowspan="2"|2010 || "Upuan" || Song of the Year || 
|-
|| Himself || Male Artist of the Year ||

USTv Students' Choice Awards

|-
| 2012 || "Walang Natira" (with Sheng Belmonte) || Best Local Music Video ||

Waki OPM Awards 101.9

|-
| 2009 || "Sumayaw Ka" || Best Dance Hit ||

Wave 891 Urban Music Awards

|-
| rowspan="3"|2014 || "Magda" (with Rico Blanco) || Best Original Song || 
|-
|| Liham at Lihim || Best Album || 
|-
|| Himself || Best Rap Artist ||

Wish 107.5 Music Awards

|-
| rowspan="4"|2016 || Himself || Wish Male Artist of the Year || 
|-
| rowspan="3"|"Businessman" || Best Wishclusive Performance by a Male Artist || 
|-
|| Wish Urban Song of the Year || 
|-
|| Wish Original Song of the Year ||

Yahoo! Celebrity Awards 

|-
| 2012 || Himself|| Male Singer of the Year || 
|-
| 2013 || Himself|| Male Performer of the year || 
|-
| 2014 || "Magda" (with Rico Blanco)|| Song of the year || 
|-

References

External links
 About Gloc-9

Gloc-9